Melinda R. Katz (born August 29, 1965) is an American attorney and politician from New York City, serving as District Attorney of Queens since January 1, 2020. A Democrat, she previously served as the Queens Borough President. Katz was also a New York City Councilwoman from 2002 to 2009. She had previously run for City Comptroller in 2009. In June 2019, Katz won the Democratic nomination for Queens County's District Attorney, and won the general election in November 2019.

Early life and education

Melinda Katz grew up in Forest Hills, Queens.

She comes from a Jewish family with a long history of civic involvement. Her father, the late David Katz, was founder of the Queens Symphony Orchestra in 1953, and her mother, the late Jeanne Dale Katz, founded the Queens Council on the Arts.

Katz earned a B.A. degree from the University of Massachusetts Amherst (summa cum laude), where she was named a Commonwealth Scholar, and later earned a J.D. degree from St. John's University School of Law.

Career 

She was recruited by the law firm Weil, Gotshal & Manges, where she worked as an associate for several years before running for the New York State Assembly. In 1995 the New York Daily News named her "one of the one hundred up-and-coming young leaders for the 21st Century."

New York State Assembly 

Katz served as a Member of the New York State Assembly from 1994 to 1999, representing Queens' 28th District, which included Forest Hills, Rego Park, and parts of Middle Village and Glendale. During her tenure as an Assembly member, Katz drafted sixteen bills that became laws, including some crucial health care initiatives. She wrote the law requiring HMOs to provide women direct access to gynecological care without forcing them to first see a primary care physician. She also was the Chair of the subcommittee on Urban Health. Additionally, she carried several bills to increase penalties for various forms of assault.

1998 Congressional Democratic Primary 

In 1998, Katz ran for Congress from New York's 9th congressional district, which was the seat held by Chuck Schumer, who was running for the U.S. Senate. She was defeated narrowly by 285 votes in the tightly contested vote, with Anthony Weiner winning the primary, and the subsequent general election.

New York City Council 

Katz then became Director of Community Boards for the Office of the Queens Borough President from 1999 to 2002, before winning a seat on the New York City Council, where she served from 2002 to 2009, representing the 29th district, which included Forest Hills, Rego Park, Kew Gardens and parts of Maspeth, South Elmhurst and Richmond Hill. Katz served as Chair of the Standing Committee on Land Use, which was responsible for approving rezoning measures for wide-ranging pockets of the city, including Williamsburg, Greenpoint and Jamaica. As chair of the committee, Katz oversaw the rezoning of 6,000 city blocks, including the Greenpoint-Williamsburg rezoning in 2005.

Private sector 
Term-limited out of the Council in 2009, Katz worked at the Greenberg Traurig law firm, where she specialized in government affairs and land use. In that position, she was paid to lobby for News Corporation.

2009 New York City Comptroller Democratic Primary 

In 2009, Katz ran for New York City Comptroller in a four-person Democratic primary. She finished third with 20 percent of the vote, behind winner John Liu and second-place David Yassky.

Borough President 

In 2012, Katz announced her plans to run for Queens Borough President in 2013. She was endorsed by Congresswoman Grace Meng, Councilman Leroy Comrie and the 1199 Hospital Workers Union. She won the Democratic nomination by defeating former New York City Councilman Peter Vallone Jr. Junior and others and the general election easily in 2013 and was re-elected in 2017.

2019 Queens District Attorney 

In December 2018, Katz announced her candidacy for Queens District Attorney. In the Democratic primary, Katz faced Tiffany Cabán, a public defender who was endorsed by several progressive politicians, including Alexandria Ocasio-Cortez and Bernie Sanders. The initial results of the Democratic primary on June 25, 2019, showed Cabán with a narrow 1.3 percent lead over Katz. Katz performed particularly well in Assembly Districts 23–29, which comprise much of Southeast Queens. On July 3, 2019, election officials said Katz pulled ahead in the final count and led Caban by a mere 20 votes, triggering a recount. On July 29, 2019, the Board of Elections certified the results of the weeks-long recount, which resulted in Katz leading Caban by 60 votes and declaring victory. Caban said she would challenge the invalidation of over 100 ballots in court. On August 6, 2019, Caban conceded the race.

Katz was sworn in and assumed office on January 6, 2020.

Personal life

Katz was in a relationship with Curtis Sliwa, the founder of the Guardian Angels, and separated from him in 2014; they have two children together, conceived in vitro over the previous five years. She is named in a court case involving Sliwa, accused by his ex-wife Mary of diverting money to Katz while still married to Mary, as part of a plan to build a "nest egg" with Katz prior to moving in with her. On February 14, 2015, the New York Daily News reported that Katz and Sliwa had separated on Election Day 2014. Katz now lives with their children in Forest Hills.

References

|-

|-

|-

1965 births
20th-century American politicians
20th-century American women politicians
21st-century American politicians
21st-century American women politicians
Jewish American state legislators in New York (state)
Lawyers from New York City
Living people
Queens County (New York) District Attorneys
Democratic Party members of the New York State Assembly
New York City Council members
People from Forest Hills, Queens
Queens borough presidents
St. John's University School of Law alumni
University of Massachusetts Amherst alumni
Women New York City Council members
21st-century American Jews